Michael United A.F.C. are a football club from the village of Kirk Michael, Isle of Man in the parish of Michael in the Isle of Man. They compete in the Isle of Man Football League and wear a green, black and white kit. They play their home games at Lough Ny Magher, Balleira Road in Kirk Michael.

History
Michael United were formed in 1919. They have won the Hospital Cup three times, the Woods Cup twice and the Paul Henry Gold Cup once. In 2003–04 they won the Woods Cup beating Police in the final on 22 February 2004. In the 2006–07 season they finished in third place in Division Two and reached the final of the Woods Cup where they lost to Douglas High School Old Boys 3–1. They were promoted to the Premier League in the 2007–08 season as runners-up to Colby and they also won the Gold Cup beating Castletown 3–0 in the final.

The club has a reserve team that play in the Isle of Man Football Combination.

Facilities
The club provides changing facilities along with a clubhouse that overlooks the pitch. The club are currently working towards completion of a training pitch with floodlights at Balleira Road. They have a campsite that opens each year during the annual Isle of Man TT motorcycle racing.

Honours

First team

League
Second Division champions: 1958–59, 2012–13.

Cup
Hospital Cup (3): 1958–59, 1960–61, 1962–63
finalist (1): 1956–57
Woods Cup (2): 1962–63, 2003–04
finalist (2): 1992–93, 2006–07
Paul Henry Gold Cup (1): 2007–08

Reserve team

League
'''Combination League champions (1): 2007–08

References

External links
Official website

Football clubs in the Isle of Man
Association football clubs established in 1919
1919 establishments in the Isle of Man